Chromium(III) picolinate is a chemical compound with the formula Cr(C5H4N(CO2H))3, commonly abbreviated as CrPic3. It is sold as a nutritional supplement to treat type 2 diabetes and promote weight loss. This bright-red coordination compound is derived from chromium(III) and picolinic acid.  Large quantities of chromium are needed for glucose utilization by insulin in normal health, but deficiency is extremely common and has been observed in people receiving 100% of their nutrient needs intravenously, i.e., total parenteral nutrition diets. Chromium has been identified as regulating insulin by increasing the sensitivity of the insulin receptor. As such, chromium(III) picolinate has been proposed as a treatment for type 2 diabetes, although its effectiveness remains controversial due to conflicting evidence from human trials.

History
A study in 1989 suggested that chromium(III) picolinate may assist in weight loss and increase muscle mass which led to an increase in the usage of chromium(III) picolinate supplements, resulting in it being for a while the second most widely used supplement behind calcium. A 2013 Cochrane review was unable to find "reliable evidence to inform firm decisions" to support such claims. Research has generally shown that it improves insulin sensitivity by either prolonging its activity or up-regulating the production of mRNA to produce more insulin receptors.

Amongst the transition metals, Cr3+ is the most controversial in terms of nutritional value and toxicity. This controversy centers on whether Cr3+ provides any nutritional benefits. Furthermore, this controversy is amplified by the fact that no Cr-containing biomolecules have had their structure characterized, nor has the mode of action been determined. The first experiment that led to the discovery of Cr3+ playing a role in glucose metabolism proposed that the biologically active form of the metal existed in a protein called glucose tolerance factor, however, new evidence suggests that it is simply an artifact obtained from isolation procedures. The only accepted indicator of chromium deficiency is the reversal of symptoms that occurs when chromium(III) supplementation is administered to people on total parenteral nutrition.

Physicochemical properties

Chromium(III) picolinate is a pinkish-red compound and was first reported in 1917. It is poorly soluble in water, having a solubility of 600 μM in water at near neutral pH. Similar to other chromium(III) compounds, it is relatively inert and unreactive, meaning that this complex is stable at ambient conditions and high temperatures are required to decompose the compound. At lower pH levels, the complex hydrolyzes to release picolinic acid and free Cr3+.

Structure

Chromium(III) picolinate has a distorted octahedral geometry and is isostructural to cobalt (III) and manganese (III) counterparts. Chromium(III) is a hard lewis acid and as such has high affinity to the carboxylate oxygen and medium affinity to the pyridine nitrogen of picolinate. Each picolinate ligand acts as a bidentate chelating agent and neutralizes the +3 charge of Cr3+. Evidence that the Cr3+ center coordinates to the pyridine nitrogen comes from a shift in the IR spectra of a C=N vibration at 1602.4 cm−1 for free picolinic acid to 1565.9 cm−1 for chromium(III) picolinate. The bond length between Cr3+ and the nitrogen atom of the pyridine ring on picolinate ranges from 2.047 to 2.048 Å. The picolinate ligand coordinates to Cr3+ only when deprotonated and this is evident by the disappearance of IR bands ranging from 2400 to 2800 cm−1 (centered at 2500 cm−1) and 1443 cm−1, corresponding to the O-H stretching and bending, respectively, on the carboxyl functional group. Furthermore, this IR shift also indicates that only one oxygen atom from the carboxylate of picolinate coordinates to the Cr3+ center. The Cr-O bond length ranges from 1.949 to 1.957 Å. The crystal structure has only been recently described in 2013. Water does not coordinate to the Cr3+ center and is instead thought to hydrogen bond between other Cr(Pic)3 complexes to form a network of Cr(Pic)3 complexes.

Biochemistry of chromium(III) picolinate

Chromium has been identified as an essential nutrient in maintaining normal blood glucose levels and as such, it is proposed to interact with two naturally occurring molecules found within the body. These interactions are most likely to occur through coordination with hard ligands such as aspartate and glutamate, as Cr(III) itself is a hard metal.

Absorption and excretion of chromium(III) picolinate
Once chromium(III) picolinate is ingested and enters the stomach, acidic hydrolysis of the complex occurs when in contact with the stomach mucosa. The hydrolyzed Cr3+ is present in the hexaaqua form and polymerizes to form an insoluble Cr(III)-hydroxide-oxide (the process of olation) once it reaches the alkaline pH of the small intestine. Approximately 2% of Cr3+ is absorbed through the gut as chromium(III) picolinate via unsaturated passive transport. Although absorption is low, CrPic3 absorbs more efficiently than other organic and inorganic sources (i.e. CrCl3 and chromium nicotinate) and thus accumulate at higher concentrations in tissues. This has been one major selling point for chromium(III) picolinate over other chromium(III) supplements. Organic sources tend to absorb better as they have ligands which are more lipophilic and usually neutralize the charge of the metal, thus permitting for easier passage through the intestinal membrane.

It has also been shown that dietary factors affect Cr3+ absorption. Starch, simple sugars, oxalic acid, and some amino acids tend to increase the rate of absorption of chromium(III). This is a result of ligand chelation, converting hexaaqua Cr3+ into more lipophilic forms. In contrast, calcium, magnesium, titanium, zinc, vanadium, and iron reduce the rate of absorption. Presumably, these ions introduce new metal-ligand equilibria, thus decreasing the lipophilic ligand pool available to Cr3+. Once absorbed into the bloodstream, 80% of the Cr3+ from CrPic3 is passed along to transferrin. The exact mechanism of release is currently unknown, however, it is believed not to occur by a single electron reduction, as in the case of Fe3+, due to the high instability of Cr2+. Administered Cr3+ can be found in all tissues ranging from 10 to 100 μg/kg body weight. It is excreted primarily in the urine (80%) while the rest is excreted in sweat and feces.

Binding of chromium(III) to transferrin

Transferrin, in addition to chromodulin has been identified as a major physiological chromium transport agent, although a recent study found that Cr3+ in fact disables transferrin from acting as a metal ion transport agent. While transferrin is highly specific for ferric ions, at normal conditions, only 30% of transferrin molecules are saturated with ferric ions, allowing for other metals, particularly those with a large charge to size ratio, to bind as well. The binding sites consist of a C-lobe and an N-lobe which are nearly identical in structure. Each lobe contains aspartic acid, histidine, 2 tyrosine residues and a bicarbonate ion that acts as a bidentate ligand to allow iron or other metals to bind to transferrin in a distorted octahedral geometry.  Evidence supporting the binding of Cr3+ to transferrin comes from extensive clinical studies that showed a positive correlation between levels of ferritin and of fasting glucose, insulin, and glycated hemoglobin (Hb1Ac) levels. Furthermore, an in vivo study in rats showed that 80% of isotopically labelled Cr3+ ended up on transferrin while the rest were bound to albumin. An in vitro study showed that when chromium(III) chloride was added to isolated transferrin, the Cr3+ readily bound transferrin, owing to changes in the UV-Vis spectrum. The formation constant for Cr3+ in the C-lobe is 1.41 x 1010 M−1 and 2.04 x 105 M−1 in the N-lobe, which indicates that Cr3+ preferentially binds the C-lobe. Overall, the formation constant for chromium(III) is lower than that of the ferric ion. The bicarbonate ligand is crucial in binding Cr3+ as when bicarbonate concentrations are very low, the binding affinity is also significantly lower. Electron paramagnetic resonance (EPR) studies have shown that below pH 6, chromium(III) binds only to the N-lobe and that at near neutral pH, chromium(III) binds to the C-lobe as well. Chromium(III) can compete with the ferric ion for binding to the C-lobe when the saturation greatly exceeds 30%. As such, these effects are only seen in patients with hemochromatosis, an iron-storage disease characterized by excessive iron saturation in transferrin.

Mechanism of action

Low-molecular-weight chromium-binding substance (LMWCr; also known as chromodulin) is an oligopeptide that seems to bind chromium(III) in the body. It consists of four amino acid residues; aspartate, cysteine, glutamate, and glycine, bonded with four (Cr3+) centers. It interacts with the insulin receptor, by prolonging kinase activity through stimulating the tyrosine kinase pathway, thus leading to improved glucose absorption. It has been confused with glucose tolerance factor. Despite recent efforts to characterize chromodulin, the exact structure is still relatively unknown.

Although chromodulin's exact mechanism of action on the insulin receptor is currently unknown, one commonly described mechanism is presented below. This proposed mechanism has the highest amount of agreement with various experiments involving chromodulin.

Normally, chromodulin exists in the apochromodulin form, which is free of Cr(III) ions and has minimal activity on insulin receptors. The apochromodulin is stored in insulin sensitive cells in the nucleus. When blood glucose levels rise, insulin is released into the bloodstream and binds to an external α-subunit of the insulin receptor, a transmembrane protein. The insulin receptor consists of 2 extracellular α-subunits and 2 transmembrane β-subunits. As soon as insulin binds to the insulin receptor, a conformational change in the receptor occurs, causing all 3 tyrosine residues (located in the β-subunits) to be phosphorylated. This activates the receptor and allows it to transmit the signal from insulin to the cell.
As mentioned above, absorbed chromium(III) picolinate eventually gives up Cr3+ to transferrin. In turn, transferrin transports Cr3+ to insulin sensitive cells (i.e. adipocytes) where it binds to apochromodulin to form holochromodulin. Holochromodulin binds to the insulin receptor, which assists in maintaining the active conformation of the insulin receptor by prolonging the kinase activity of kinases or up-regulating the amount of insulin receptor mRNA levels, thus decreasing blood glucose levels.

Experiments were able to show that chromium(III) was capable of up-regulating insulin-stimulated insulin signal transduction via affecting downstream molecules of the IR, as evidenced by enhanced levels of tyrosine phosphorylation of IRS-1, elevated Thr308 and Ser473 phosphorylation of Akt, and increased PI3-K activity in a variety of cellular and animal models. The increased IRS-1 phosphorylation led to increased insulin receptor sensitivity while Akt and PI3-K led to enhanced GLUT4 translocation to the cell surface, thus causing greater uptake of glucose.

It has also been shown that chromium(III) can alleviate insulin resistance by reducing endoplasmic reticulum (ER) stress. ER stress is defined as an accumulation of misfolded and unfolded proteins in the ER lumen. ER stress leads to stimulation of c-Jun terminal kinase (JNK), which in turn phosphorylates the serine residue of IRS, leading to suppression of insulin signaling cascade and less glucose uptake. Experimental findings suggest that chromium inhibits ER stress and hence the suppression of insulin signaling is uplifted. The exact mechanism is unknown.

Another way that Cr(III) may prolong the insulin receptor's kinase activity is through the oxidation of a critical active site cysteine residue on protein-tyrosine phosphatase 1B (PTP1B). Normally, PTP1B dephosphorylates phosphotyrosine residues by carrying out nucleophilic attack on the phosphate group via its cysteine residue, thus inactivating the insulin receptor. This process removes the phosphate group from the tyrosine residue to form a Cys—S—PO32− group that is subsequently hydrolyzed by water to regenerate the cysteine residue, permitting for another round of action.  Research has shown that chromium(III) may in fact cause irreversible inhibition of PTP1B. It is thought that Cr(III) is converted to Cr(VI) or Cr(V) (through the action of oxidoreductases) which then oxidize the thiol of the cysteine residue on PTP1B to sulfenic acid, consequently rendering it unable to attack the phosphate group on phosphotyrosine. However, this is only a plausible mechanism, and no direct evidence has been shown to support this hypothesis.
When the signal cascade is turned off, holochromodulin is eliminated in urine since the formation constant is too large to remove Cr(III) directly. Experimental evidence has shown that the loss of chromodulin from cells is correlated with an increase in chromium concentrations in the urine after ingesting food rich in carbohydrates (i.e. glucose).

Health claims and debates

Body weight
Chromium(III) picolinate has been marketed in the United States as an aid to body development for athletes and as a means of losing weight. Reviews have reported either no effect on either muscle growth or fat loss, or else a modest but statistically significant -1.1 kg (2.4 lb) weight loss in trials longer than 12 weeks. The European Food Safety Authority reviewed the literature and concluded that there was insufficient evidence to support a claim.

Diabetes
There are claims that the picolinate form of chromium supplementation aids in reducing insulin resistance and improving glucose metabolism, particularly in type 2 diabetics, but reviews showed no association between chromium and glucose or insulin concentrations for non-diabetics, and inconclusive results for diabetics. The authors of the second review mentioned that chromium picolinate decreased HbA1c levels by 0.7% in type 2 diabetes patients, they observed that poor quality studies produced larger positive outcomes than higher quality studies. Two reviews concluded that chromium(III) picolinate may be more effective at lowering blood glucose levels compared to other chromium-containing dietary supplements.

In 2005, the U.S. Food and Drug Administration (FDA) approved a qualified health claim for chromium picolinate as a dietary supplement relating to insulin resistance and risk of type 2 diabetes. Any company wishing to make such a claim must use the exact wording: "One small study suggests that chromium picolinate may reduce the risk of insulin resistance, and therefore possibly may reduce the risk of type 2 diabetes. FDA concludes, however, that the existence of such a relationship between chromium picolinate and either insulin resistance or type 2 diabetes is highly uncertain." As part of the petition review process, the FDA rejected other claims for reducing abnormally elevated blood sugar, risk of cardiovascular disease, risk of retinopathy or risk of kidney disease. In 2006 the FDA added that the "relationship between chromium(III) picolinate intake and insulin resistance is highly uncertain".

Variability of studies
There was no consistency observed in clinical results relating chromium(III) picolinate to adequate treatment of type 2 diabetes. This is due to the degree of glucose intolerance of patients that participate in the clinical studies. Glucose intolerance is a gradient and the intensity is affected by ethnicity, degree of obesity, age, distribution of body fat and many other factors. In some studies, low dosages of the supplement were given, however, a suitable amount of chromium(III) picolinate must be administrated to a person before any appreciable drop in glucose levels are observed due to differing levels of insulin resistance. Another important point to mention is that diabetes is not always caused by glucose intolerance. As mentioned before, Cr(III) has been shown to only influence glucose intolerance and not insulin levels. Furthermore, the environments in which the studies were performed were not consistent. The levels of stress, diets consumed by patients and patient genetics were variable among study subjects. This is also true of the controls amongst different studies in which the subjects having diabetes were already being treated with a wide variety of antidiabetic drugs, which can reduce the effects of chromium on affecting insulin activity. This could explain why animal studies tend to yield more positive results owing to the fact that these diabetic animals were not treated with antidiabetic drugs for the control group. Also, as mentioned in the absorption and excretion section, the absorption/bioavailability of chromium(III) picolinate is influenced by the diet. Collectively, these different factors have contributed to the variability in the studies.

Safety and toxicity
Initial concerns were raised that chromium(III) picolinate is more likely to cause DNA damage and mutation than other forms of trivalent chromium, but these results are also debated. These concerns were based, in part, on studies in fruit flies, where chromium(III) picolinate supplementation generates chromosomal aberrations, impedes progeny development, and causes sterility and lethal mutations.

A study was published to assess the toxicity of Cr(III) picolinate on humans. The researchers that conducted this study used previous knowledge that Cr(III) is reduced to Cr(II) by cellular reductants such as NADH or cysteine. This reduced form of Cr(II) is shown to react with H2O2 to generate radical species which in turn oxidize DNA base pairs. With this knowledge in mind, the researchers administered ten women with 400 μg of chromium(III) picolinate a day for an eight-week period. By measuring the amount of an oxidized DNA base pair, 5-hydroxymethyl uracil using antibody titers, the group could infer the amount of DNA base pair oxidation occurring in direct relation to chromium(III) picolinate. The results of the study suggested that chromium(III) picolinate itself does not cause significant chromosomal damage in vivo.

Generally speaking, it has been shown that chromium(III) picolinate is not toxic to humans. For most adults, it can be taken orally in doses up 1000 μg per day. This low toxicity has generally been associated with low absorbance of Cr(III) in the body through the lungs, skin and gastrointestinal tract, coupled with high excretion. Normally, 99% of chromium(III) taken can be recovered in the feces of the user. There have been isolated incidences of chromium(III) supplementation leading to kidney failure, however this relationship is unclear and has yet to be tested.

Regulation of chromium(III) picolinate
In 2004, the UK Food Standards Agency advised consumers to use other forms of trivalent chromium in preference to chromium(III) picolinate until specialist advice was received from the Committee on Mutagenicity. This was due to concerns raised by the Expert Group on Vitamins and Minerals that chromium(III) picolinate might be genotoxic (cause cancer). The committee also noted two case reports of kidney failure that might have been caused by this supplement and called for further research into its safety. In December 2004, the Committee on Mutagenicity published its findings, which concluded that "overall it can be concluded that the balance of the data suggest that chromium(III) picolinate should be regarded as not being mutagenic in vitro" and that "the available in-vivo tests in mammals with chromium(III) picolinate are negative". Following these findings, the UK Food Standards Agency withdrew its advice to avoid chromium(III) picolinate, though it plans to keep its advice about chromium supplements under review.

In 2010, chromium(III) picolinate was approved by Health Canada to be used in dietary supplements. Approved labeling statements include: a factor in the maintenance of good health, provides support for healthy glucose metabolism, helps the body to metabolize carbohydrates and helps the body to metabolize fats.

References

External links

Merck Manual

Coordination complexes
Dietary supplements
Picolinates
Chromium(III) compounds